Eleni Andriola (born November 9, 1986) is a Greek rhythmic gymnast.

Born in Athens, she started rhythmic gymnastics in 1994, and she has been on the Greek National Team since 1998. Eleni's first international event was the 2001 World Championships in Madrid, Spain.

Andriola was the top Greek rhythmic gymnast in 2004, as well as in 2003. Her all-around results at the 2003 World Championships in Budapest, Hungary represented a 10-rank improvement from her finish at the 2001 World Championships in Madrid.

She competed at the 2004 Athens Olympics and qualified for the final in 6th with a score of 99.600, in the final she was placed 9th with a score of 97.600. She competed again at the 2008 Summer Olympics in Beijing and finished 21st, with 59.700 points

References
 
 

1986 births
Living people
Greek rhythmic gymnasts
Gymnasts at the 2004 Summer Olympics
Gymnasts at the 2008 Summer Olympics
Olympic gymnasts of Greece
Mediterranean Games bronze medalists for Greece
Competitors at the 2005 Mediterranean Games
Mediterranean Games medalists in gymnastics
Gymnasts from Athens